Skyways is an Australian television soap opera drama series made by Crawford Productions for the Seven Network.

Production and casting
The series, which aired from 1979 to 1981, was set at the fictional Pacific International Airport and dealt with the lives of the pilots, airline staff and management team who worked there.

Skyways was mainly taped in a television studio where, in many interior-set scenes, Colour Separation Overlay created the illusion of a bustling airport with taxiing planes outside the window. Many of the exterior scenes were shot on location at Melbourne Airport.

The show's regular cast members included Tony Bonner as airport manager Paul MacFarlane, later replaced by Gary Doolan (Gerard Kennedy). Tina Bursill played glamorous and ruthless assistant manager Louise Carter.  Bill Stalker, played head of airport security Peter Fanelli, an ex-detective. When Skyways ended Fanelli was moved to Crawford police procedural Cop Shop, while Brian James' character George Tippett was transplanted to Holiday Island.

Kylie Minogue and Jason Donovan roles

Years before Neighbours and international pop stardom, Kylie Minogue and Jason Donovan appeared together in one episode as siblings.

Storylines
An early storyline featured a lesbian flight attendant (Judy Morris) unsuccessfully attempting to seduce a colleague (Deborah Coulls) who revealed she was heterosexual. Morris' character was soon afterwards stabbed to death in the shower as part of a murder-mystery storyline.

International broadcast
The series screened across Europe and the UK during 1985–1986 on Sky Channel which would later become Sky One. It also aired in the UK on Astra Satellite channel Lifestyle during 1990 at 1.00 p.m Monday to Friday.

Syndication
During the first week of January 2006 the entire series was replayed Thursday early mornings weekly at 2.00am then at the later time-slot of 3.00am on WIN TV in Wollongong, South Coast NSW as part of the early morning Crawfords Classics TV series.

Cast

 Tony Bonner – Paul MacFarlane
 Tina Bursill – Louise Carter
 Ken James – Simon Young
 Bruce Barry – Douglas Stewart
 Bill Stalker – Peter Fanelli
 Brian James  – George Tippett
 Joanne Samuel – Kelly Morgan
 Deborah Coulls – Jacki Soong
 Kris McQuade – Faye Peterson
 Bartholomew John – Nick Grainger
 Judy Morris – Robyn Morris
 Andrew McKaige – Alan MacFarlane
 Gaynor Martin – Mandy MacFarlane
 Gerard Kennedy – Gary Doolan
 Kerry Armstrong – Angela Murray
 Maurie Fields – Chas Potter
 Kylie Foster – Belinda Phipps
 Charles Tingwell – Harold Forbes
 Ron Falk – Derek Powell
 Cecily Polson – Jocelyn Powell
 Carmen Duncan – Elaine MacFarlane
 Anne Charleston – Wendy Stewart
 Belinda Giblin – Christine Burroughs
 Fred Parslow – David Rankin
 Irene Inescort – Mrs. Young
 John Walton – Bryan Johnson
 Susanna Lobez – Janet Patterson
 Kit Taylor – Tim Barclay
 Dina Mann – Fiona Woods
 Jeff Kevin – Geoff Goodwin
 Michael Duffield – Sir Joseph Miles
 Penelope Stewart – Barbie Beach

External links
 
Aussie Soap Archive: Skyways
Crawford Productions
Skyways at the National Film and Sound Archive

Seven Network original programming
Australian television soap operas
1979 Australian television series debuts
1981 Australian television series endings
Aviation television series
Television series by Crawford Productions
English-language television shows